Enni Rukajärvi (born 13 May 1990) is a Finnish snowboarder. She won the gold medal at the 2011 FIS Snowboarding World Championships in the slopestyle event. Rukajärvi also won gold in Snowboard SlopeStyle at the 2011 Winter X Games XV in Aspen.

Enni won the silver medal representing Finland in slopestyle at the 2014 Winter Olympics in Sochi. At the 2018 Winter Olympics in PyeongChang, she won a bronze medal in slopestyle and also competed in big air.

References

External links
FIS-Ski.com – Biography

1990 births
Living people
Finnish female snowboarders
X Games athletes
Snowboarders at the 2014 Winter Olympics
Snowboarders at the 2018 Winter Olympics
Snowboarders at the 2022 Winter Olympics
Olympic snowboarders of Finland
Olympic silver medalists for Finland
Olympic bronze medalists for Finland
Medalists at the 2014 Winter Olympics
Medalists at the 2018 Winter Olympics
Olympic medalists in snowboarding
People from Kuusamo
Sportspeople from North Ostrobothnia